Catharine Webb Barber (Barber; after first marriage, Towles or Towle; after second marriage, McCoy; October 25, 1823 - November 15, 1893) was an American teacher, newspaper editor, and author. She was born in Massachusetts, but came South, settling first in Georgia and afterward in Alabama. According to The Alabama Review, 1983,— "Establishing a bibliography of the works of Catharine W . Barber Towles McCoy is as difficult as establishing the facts of her life. Only a few of her numerous contributions to ephemeral Georgia periodicals can now definitely be known."

Biography
Catharine  Webb Barber was born in Charlemont, a village on the banks of the Deerfield River, in Franklin County, Massachusetts, October 25, 1823. She was the youngest of ten children of Rufus Barber, of Worcester, Massachusetts, a New England farmer. In 1843, her father died, and Barber, at the advice of her brother, came south, and entered the Lafayette Female Seminary, at Chambers Court House, Alabama. She afterwards taught in the same institution.

Barber began to write verses for the newspapers at an early age. From 1849 to 1852, in Madison, Georgia, she served as editor of the Madison Visitor. In 1861, she moved to Newnan, Georgia, and became editor of the Southern Literary Companion, which she continued to edit until its suspension in 1865. For several newspapers and magazines, she filled the role of the "Women's Department" editor. 

In 1866, she became the editor and proprietor of Miss Barber's Weekly, which she continued till her marriage to John Culbreath Towles (1813-1877), of Lafayette, in 1867. 

In 1884, she married Jett T. McCoy (1823-1887). After his death in 1887, she resided at Columbus, Georgia.  

She published Stories for the Freemason's Fireside (New York, 1860); The Three Golden Links (Cassville, Georgia, 1857); and Poor Claire, or Life Among the Queer (1888). Her novelette Briarbrook (1866) was published by Scott's Monthly Magazine. 

She died November 15, 1893, in Columbus, Georgia.

Awards and honors
She received honorary degrees from southern colleges.

Selected works

 The Three Golden Links (Cassville, Georgia, 1857)
 Stories for the American Freemason's Fireside (1860)
 Briarbrook (1866)
 Poor Claire, or Life Among the Queer (1888)

Notes

References

Attribution

Bibliography
 
 
 

1823 births
1893 deaths
19th-century American writers
19th-century American newspaper editors
19th-century American newspaper publishers (people)
People from Franklin County, Massachusetts